Neurophyseta comoralis is a moth in the family Crambidae. It was described by Strand in 1916. It is found on the Comoros, where it has been recorded from Anjouan.

References

Moths described in 1916
Musotiminae